Oron is a municipality in the district of Lavaux-Oron in the canton of Vaud in Switzerland.  It was formed on 1 January 2012 when the former municipalities of Bussigny-sur-Oron, Châtillens, Chesalles-sur-Oron, Ecoteaux, Oron-la-Ville, Oron-le-Châtel, Palézieux, Les Tavernes, Les Thioleyres and Vuibroye merged. On 1 January 2022 the former municipality of Essertes merged into Oron.

History
Bussigny-sur-Oron is first mentioned in 1433 as Bussignye.  In 1517 it was mentioned in a land registry of Count Jean II de Gruyère.  Châtillens is first mentioned in 1141 as Castellens.  The village of Chesalles-sur-Oron was first mentioned in 1330 when the surrounding land was acquired by the Bishop of Lausanne.  Ecoteaux is first mentioned in 1134 as Escotaux.  Oron-la-Ville is first mentioned about 280 as Uromago.  In 1018 it was mentioned as Auronum.  Oron-le-Châtel is first mentioned in 1137 as Oruns.  Palézieux is first mentioned in 1134 as de Palaisol.

Blazon
The blazon of the municipal coat of arms is Gules, a Lion rampant Argent, surrounded by ten Billets of the same.

Geography

Demographics

Historic Population
The historical population is given in the following chart:

Heritage sites of national significance
The Temple of Oron-la-Ville, Oron Castle and its library, the Cistercian abbey of Haut Crêt are listed as a Swiss heritage site of national significance.  The entire old town of Oron-le-Châtel is part of the Inventory of Swiss Heritage Sites.

Twin Town
Oron-la-Ville is twinned with the town of Bussac, France.  Palézieux is twinned with the town of Vers-Pont du Gard, France.

Formation
The municipality was formed on 1 January 2012 with the merger of the (now former) municipalities of Bussigny-sur-Oron, Châtillens, Chesalles-sur-Oron, Ecoteaux, Oron-la-Ville, Oron-le-Châtel, Palézieux, Les Tavernes, Les Thioleyres and Vuibroye.

Transportation

Notes and references

External links 

Cultural property of national significance in the canton of Vaud